Shlomo Benado (born c. January 1950) is a former Israeli footballer who played in Maccabi Haifa.

He is the father of Arik Benado, a former player who now works as the manager of Maccabi Haifa.

References

1950 births
Living people
Israeli Jews
Israeli footballers
Maccabi Haifa F.C. players
Footballers from Haifa
Association footballers not categorized by position